The University of Minnesota College of Pharmacy is the pharmacy school of the University of Minnesota. It has two campus locations: in Minneapolis and Duluth, Minnesota. The University of Minnesota College of Pharmacy is part of one of the largest Academic Health Centers (AHC) in the United States. This center allows health professionals to train collaboratively during the course of their training programs. The AHC comprises the College of Pharmacy, School of Dentistry, Medical School, School of Nursing, School of Public Health, and the College of Veterinary Medicine:.

History 
The University of Minnesota College of Pharmacy opened in 1892 with Frederick J. Wulling serving as Dean. Only six of the original 15 students completed the two-year program on time and were granted a pharmaceutical doctor degree in 1894. Three years later the first women were admitted to the college, all of whom graduated.

Wulling established a nationally recognized medicinal plant garden at the University. He dedicated two acres to the exclusive cultivation of the heart stimulant digitalis, which helped produce over 20,000 bottles of tincture during World War I.

Wulling's successors as dean are:
Charles Rogers, 1936-1957
George Hager, 1957-1965
Lawrence Weaver, 1966-1984
Gilbert Banker, 1985-1992
Bob Cipolle (Interim), 1992-1994
Lawrence Weaver (Interim), 1994-1996
Marilyn Speedie, 1996-2017
Lynda Welage, 2017-

The Duluth program began in 2003 and was intended to address the severe shortage of pharmacists in Minnesota, especially in Greater Minnesota, at that time.

Academics 
The University of Minnesota College of Pharmacy offers the Doctor of Pharmacy degree (PharmD), Master of Science (MS) and Doctoral (PhD) degrees, and dual-degree programs for students interested in combining their pharmacy education with a degree in public health (PharmD/MPH), or business (PharmD/MBA).

In addition, the University of Minnesota College of Pharmacy also has pharmacy residency as part of its education programs.

The Twin Cities campus enrolls approximately 100 PharmD students per class, while the Duluth campus enrolls approximately 50 students per class.

Ranking 
In 2016, U.S. News & World Report ranked the University of Minnesota College of Pharmacy second in the United States.

Notable faculty and alumni 
Gunda Georg
Philip S. Portoghese
Robert Vince

References

External links 
 Official website

University of Minnesota
Pharmacy schools in the United States
1892 establishments in Minnesota